As of 26 June 2017, a total of 165 players uncapped players have made an appearance for the British and Irish Lions, a rugby union team selected from players eligible for any of the Home Nations – the national sides of England, Ireland, Scotland and Wales. The Lions generally select international players, but they can pick uncapped players available to any one of the four unions.

The 165 uncapped players represent approximately 20% of the 835 players who have made an appearance for the Lions. Of the 165 players these 41 were later capped by their national side while 124 were never capped. The most recent uncapped player was Will Greenwood who toured South Africa with the Lions in 1997 before getting his first cap for England later that year. The most recent uncapped player for the Lions who was never capped for his national team was Alun Lewis, who featured on the 1977 Lions tour to New Zealand.

The following is a list of rugby union players who have played for the British and Irish Lions but were never capped for their own countries or adopted countries. Where the country of origin of the player is not known, he is identified by the country of his club. By far the majority of the players on this list seem to originate from England. Players who took part in tours to Argentina are italicised.

Sources
 Bath, Richard (ed.) The Scotland Rugby Miscellany (Vision Sports Publishing Ltd, 2007 )
 Godwin, Terry Complete Who's Who of International Rugby (Cassell, 1987)
 espnscrum.com

References

Lists of British & Irish Lions rugby union players